Paul Rivière (22 November 191215 December 1998) was a French Resistance fighter and politician. He joined the Resistance from 1941, took part in the Indochina and Algeria Wars.

Biography

Early life
Paul Rivière was born in Montagny  in the Loire department in central France.

Resistance activities
In 1939, he was called up as an instructor for Cadets de Saumur. He was injured during the fighting for Pont de Gennes, then demobilised and returned to his position as literatur professor in the Saint-Joseph Jesuit Day School in Lyon.

In late February 1941, Father Chaillet, Jesuit in Lyon, put him in touch with Henri Frenay and Berty Albrecht and he became involved with the French resistance.
 
In early 1942, he abandoned propaganda for action and became liaison officer for Jean Moulin, General Charles de Gaulle's representative in France and the leader of the internal Resistance.

After a first airdrop, he was arrested and detained four months by Vichy France police. Upon his release, he continued his mission clandestinely until the end of War. With Mouvements unis de la Résistance (MUR), he was deeply involved in the organization of the radio transmission services and covert air operations for Southern France.

After the Jean Moulin arrest in Caluire, he was ordered by the Bureau Central de Renseignements et d'Action to reorganize the Landing-Airdrop Section (in French "Section Atterrissages-Parachutages" or SAP).

He controlled SAP until the end of War and was Head of Operations for the Rhône-Alpes Region where he organized the most important covert landing and airdrop operations : several hundred of tons of weapons and equipment and millions of French francs were so routed to the French resistance.

He also organized the transfer of numerous personalities and agents between France and London: General Jean de Lattre de Tassigny, Vincent Auriol, Emmanuel d'Astier de la Vigerie, Jacques Chaban-Delmas, Maurice Bourgès-Maunoury, François de Menthon, Henri Frenay, Daniel Mayer, Christian Pineau, Lucie and Raymond Aubrac.

After the war
He joined the military service in 1947 with the rank of lieutenant-colonel. He was Inspector General of the French Armed Forces, then he was sent to Indochina for two years in 1953, to Konstanz in Germany in 1955 then in Algeria in 1956.

From December 1956 to 1959, he was Military Attache in Tokyo, then security adviser in Algeria until Évian Accords.

From November 1962 until 1978, he was member of the National Assembly, deputy of the Loire department from 1962 to 1978 and mayor of Montagny, Loire until 1983. During the same period, he sat on the Council of Europe.

He died on 15 December 1998 in Lyon and was buried in Montagny.

Pseudonyms during French resistance

 François
 Charles-Henri
 Sif bis
 Galvani
 Marquis

Military honours
 Commander of the Legion of Honour
 Order of Liberation
 War Cross 1939–1945 (6 citations)
 Cross for Military Valour (3 citations)
 Medal of the Resistance with Officer rosette
 Colonial Medal with clasp "Far East"
 Cross of the Volunteer Combatant of the Resistance
 Escapees' Medal
 Officer of the Most Excellent Order of the British Empire
 Military Medal 
 Order of the Crown (Belgium) (Officer)
 War Cross (Belgium) with Palm
 Czechoslovak War Cross
 Cross for Military Valour (Poland)

References

Bibliography
 Hugh Verity, "We landed by moonlight", Crécy publishing limited, 2000
  Centre d'Histoire de la Résistance et de la Déportation, "Fonds d'archives Geneviève et Paul Rivière" – Les opérations aériennes (atterrissages, parachutages) en zone sud. 1941 - 1944, Les grands fonds d'archives du CHRD, N°1.
  Noguères Henri, Degliame-Fouche Marcel, Vigier Jean-Louis, Histoire de la Résistance en France de 1940 à 1945, 5 vol, Paris, Robert Laffont, 1967-1981.
  Vistel Alban, La nuit sans ombre. Histoire des mouvements unis de résistance, leur rôle dans la libération du sud-est, Paris, Fayard, 1970.
 All the personal archives of Paul et Geneviève Rivière are  freely accessible in the Center for the History of the Resistance and Deportation in Lyon, France.

External links
 Résistance Foundation Website.
 Center for the History of the Resistance and Deportation Website.

1912 births
1998 deaths
People from Loire (department)
Politicians from Auvergne-Rhône-Alpes
Democratic Union of Labour politicians
Union of Democrats for the Republic politicians
Deputies of the 2nd National Assembly of the French Fifth Republic
Deputies of the 3rd National Assembly of the French Fifth Republic
Deputies of the 4th National Assembly of the French Fifth Republic
Deputies of the 5th National Assembly of the French Fifth Republic
French military personnel of World War II
French Resistance members
French military personnel of the First Indochina War
French military personnel of the Algerian War
Companions of the Liberation
Recipients of the Czechoslovak War Cross